Maria College is a private Catholic college in Albany, New York.

History
Maria College was founded in 1958 by the Religious Sisters of Mercy to serve as a sister formation college, an institution where aspiring Sisters of Mercy could receive a college degree that would qualify them to teach.  Under the leadership of Maria College's first President, Sister Mary Borromeo, the focus on educating only religious sisters slowly changed, and the college received permission to open its doors to the public in 1964.

Originally chartered by the New York Board of Regents as a junior college, Maria College offered a number of associate degrees in areas ranging from early childhood education to business management.  Degree emphasis later changed to the health sciences, with particular emphasis on nursing, physical therapy assistant and occupational therapy assistant programs.  The charter was changed in September 2013 to allow Maria College to become a baccalaureate degree-granting institution.

Academics
The college offers certificates as well as associate and bachelor's degree programs in a variety of disciplines. It is accredited by the Middle States Commission on Higher Education.
 
Maria College is one of 17 colleges and universities sponsored by the national Conference for Mercy Higher Education network.  Together the institutions in this network enroll more than 40,000 students throughout the United States.

Campus

The Maria College campus is located on New Scotland Avenue, west of Manning Boulevard in Albany, New York.

In 1968, the Religious Sisters of Mercy undertook a fundraising campaign and raised the funds to build the Maria College Main Building—a structure adjacent to their convent on New Scotland Avenue.  The Main Building became the official home of Maria College and is still in use today.  Recently renovated, it houses faculty offices, classrooms for business administration and liberal arts, science labs, the student cafe', fitness center, bookstore, library, business office and the president's office.
In 1971, the college opened a preschool, behind the Main Building, that served Albany families for more than 40 years.  Now closed, the campus school building was converted to classrooms in 2013, and also provides a home to the college admissions center and financial aid office.
In 1975, Maria College purchased the adjacent Monastery of the Immaculate Conception, incorporating it into the Maria College campus.  The monastery was converted into educational space and was renamed Marian Hall.  Known for its distinctive architecture and inner courtyard, Marian Hall was awarded a designation by the Historic Albany Foundation in 1986.  Today, Marian Hall houses Maria Administration.  On April 25, 2018, the college's 60-year anniversary, the McAuley Building was dedicated and is the new home for health professions—both the nursing and occupational therapy assistant programs are housed in McAuley.  Adjacent to Marian Hall is the campus green—a large area that provides a venue for students between classes and is home to a number of large campus events.

External links 
Official website

Educational institutions established in 1958
Education in Albany, New York
Universities and colleges in Albany County, New York
Catholic universities and colleges in New York (state)
Organizations based in Albany, New York
Sisters of Mercy colleges and universities
1958 establishments in New York (state)